Nanjing International Youth Cultural Center (Chinese: 南京国际青年文化中心) are two skyscrapers in Nanjing, Jiangsu, China designed by Zaha Hadid Architects. Construction began in 2012 and ended in 2015.

See also
List of tallest buildings in China

References

Skyscraper office buildings in Nanjing
Skyscraper hotels in Nanjing
Skyscrapers in Nanjing